Mark Peter Convery (born 29 May 1981) is an English football manager and former footballer. Since November 2015, he has been manager of Newcastle Benfield.

Career
Born in Newcastle upon Tyne, Tyne and Wear, Convery started his career with Sunderland in 1999 and he joined Hvidovre IF of the Danish First Division on loan for four months in July 2000. He made his debut for the team against Ølstykke FC on 30 July 2000 and made six appearances during his loan spell.

He was signed by Third Division side Darlington in January 2001 on a free transfer.

He signed for York City in the Conference National on 30 June 2005. He signed a new deal at York in July 2006 after being offered a contract extension earlier that summer. He had been out of action since mid-October 2006 with a foot injury and it is now thought he had damaged a metatarsal, with a visit to a specialist expected to confirm another six-week lay-off, and made his comeback for the team against Northwich Victoria on 6 March 2007. He was released by York City at the end of the 2006–07 season on 16 May 2007.

He was signed by Conference Premier side Cambridge United on 2 July 2007, after agreeing a two-year contract with the club. He made his debut against former club York in August 2007, during which he sustained a hamstring injury. He joined Weymouth on loan until the end of the 2007–08 season in March and made his debut in a 4–2 defeat against Farsley Celtic. Convery was believed to have been made available for transfer by Cambridge after the end of the season. He eventually remained with the club and scored from long-range in Cambridge's match against Crawley Town on 15 November in the 90th minute, which ensured a 2–2 draw for the team, and he hoped this would ensure him a place in the team. He was released by the club on 24 March 2009, after being informed he would not be offered a new contract in the summer. He later joined Newcastle Blue Star in the Northern Premier League Division One North.

He was named in former club Darlington's squad, when the North East club's squad numbers were released, having played in a couple of their pre-season matches at the beginning of the 2009–10 season. He scored for Darlington from close range in their 2–1 defeat to Leeds United in the Football League Trophy on 6 October. He was released by the club following their relegation from League Two, along with 13 other players.

Convery joined Northern League Division One team Bedlington Terriers during the summer of 2010.

Convery then went on to join fellow Northern League Division One rivals Whitley Bay in the summer of 2013.

Career statistics

Honours
Newcastle Blue Star
Northern Premier League Division One North play-offs: 2008–09

References

External links

1981 births
Living people
Footballers from Newcastle upon Tyne
English footballers
English expatriate footballers
Association football midfielders
Sunderland A.F.C. players
Hvidovre IF players
Darlington F.C. players
York City F.C. players
Cambridge United F.C. players
Weymouth F.C. players
Newcastle Blue Star F.C. players
Bedlington Terriers F.C. players
English Football League players
National League (English football) players
Northern Premier League players
Expatriate men's footballers in Denmark
English expatriate sportspeople in Denmark